Sangnok-gu (상록구) is a district of the city of Ansan in Gyeonggi-do, South Korea. The name "Sangnok" is came from the name of famous Korean novel Sangnoksu (meaning "evergreens"), written by Sim Hoon in 1936.

Administrative divisions
Sangnok-gu is divided into the following dongs:

See also
Ansan
Danwon-gu

References

External links
English Website

 
Ansan
Districts in Gyeonggi Province